Sexualization of the buttocks, especially of the female sex, has occurred throughout history.

Evolutionary significance
Sexologist Alfred Kinsey has suggested that the buttocks are the primary sexual presentation site in primates. Some anthropologists and sociobiologists believe that breast fetishism derives from the breasts' similarity to buttocks, but instead provide sexual attraction when the body is seen from the front.

In humans, females generally have more round and voluptuous buttocks, caused by estrogen that encourages the body to store fat in the buttocks, hips, and thighs. Testosterone discourages fat storage in these areas. The buttocks in human females thus contain more adipose tissue than in males, especially after puberty. Evolutionary psychologists suggest that rounded buttocks may have evolved as a desirable trait because they provide a visual indication of the woman's youth and fertility. They signal the presence of estrogen and the presence of sufficient fat stores for pregnancy and lactation. Additionally, the buttocks give an indication of the shape and size of the pelvis, which impacts reproductive capability. Since development and pronunciation of the buttocks begins at menarche and declines with age, full buttocks are also a symbol of youth.

Biological anthropologist Helen B. Fisher said that "perhaps, the fleshy, rounded buttocks attracted males during rear-entry intercourse". In a 2017 study, using 3D models and eye-tracking technology Fisher's claim was tested and was shown that the slight thrusting out of a woman's back influence how attractive others perceive her to be and captures the gaze of both men and women. Bobbi S. Low et al. said that the female buttocks "evolved in the context of females competing for the attention and parental commitment of powerful resource-controlling males" as an "honest display of fat reserves" that could not be confused with another type of tissue, although T. M. Caro rejected that as being a necessary conclusion, stating that female fatty deposits on the hips improve individual fitness of the female, regardless of sexual selection.

History

The female buttocks have been a symbol of fertility and beauty since early human history. Statues created as early as 24,000 BC, such as the Venus of Willendorf, have exaggerated buttocks, hips, and thighs.

The erotic beauty of the female buttocks was important to the ancient Greeks, thought to have built such statues as Venus Kallipygos (although only a possible Roman copy survives), that emphasize the buttocks. Bare buttocks were also considered erotic in Ming China, where they were often compared to the bright full moon.  Many artists pose models to emphasize the buttocks.

The buttocks have been considered an erogenous zone in Western thought for centuries; the eroticization of the female buttocks was due to their association and closeness to the female reproductive organs. The buttocks are often taboo due to their proximity to the anus and association with the excretory system. The psychoanalyst Sigmund Freud theorized that psychosexual development occurred in three stagesoral, anal, and genitaland that fixation in the anal stage caused anal retentiveness and a lasting focus on eroticization of the anus.

Spanking was prominent in pornography in Victorian Britain with erotica such as Lady Bumtickler's Revels and Exhibition of Female Flagellants being consumed.

In Studies in the Psychology of Sex, published in 1927 and written by British physician and sexual psychologist Havelock Ellis, he describes cultural sexual characteristics of the buttocks. He says:

He adds that

Ellis also claims that corsets and bustles are meant to emphasize the buttocks.

Emphasis on the female buttocks as a sexual characteristic has increased in recent times according to Ray B. Browne, who attributes the change to the popularization of denim jeans:

Males

While female buttocks are often eroticized in heterosexual erotica, men's buttocks are considered erogenous by many women, and are also eroticized in male homosexuality which often centers on anal intercourse.

Fetishism
A buttock fetish or buttock partialism is a condition wherein the buttocks become a primary focus of sexual attention. It may be associated with coprophilia, panty fetishism, eproctophilia, and sadomasochistic corporal punishment involving the buttocks. Pygophilia is sexual arousal caused by the buttocks.

See also
 Anal eroticism
 Anal sex
 Awoulaba
 Body worship
 Dimples of Venus
 History of erotic depictions
 History of human sexuality
 
 Partialism
 Steatopygia

References

External links
 

Sexual fetishism
History of human sexuality
Sexuality and society
Buttocks